QCD, or Quantum chromodynamics, is the theory of the strong interaction between quarks and gluons.

QCD may also refer to:

Business
 Quality, cost, delivery, in lean manufacturing
 Quality Custom Distribution, a subsidiary of Golden State Foods
 AGFiQ Enhanced Core Canadian Equity ETF (stock ticker: QCD); see List of Canadian exchange-traded funds

Other uses
 Qualified Charitable Distribution in US income tax law
 Quintessential Player, formerly known as Quintessential CD; a freeware media player
 quasi-circular depression, a type of geographic feature on Mars; see Geology of Mars
 Quad City Downs, East Moline, Illinois, USA; a horse race track

See also

 
 KQCD, callsign QCD in region K
 WQCD (disambiguation), callsign QCD in region W